Thomas Strahan (May 10, 1847 – December 19, 1910) was a Massachusetts businessman and politician who served as the thirteenth Mayor of Chelsea, Massachusetts and in the Massachusetts House of Representatives.

Biography
Thomas Straham was born in Stirling, Scotland on May 10, 1847. He was educated at the Cotting Academy in Arlington, Virginia, and at Phillips Exeter Academy.

He married Esther Lawrence on November 28, 1867, and they had six children.

A Republican, he served on the Common Council of Chelsea, Massachusetts from 1880 to 1883, and was its president in the latter year. He was elected Chelsea's mayor in 1883, and was a member of the Massachusetts House of Representatives in 1884.

He died in Brookline, Massachusetts on December 19, 1910.

Thomas Strahan Company
Strahan formed the Thomas Strahan Company in 1866. Thomas Strahan is one of the oldest wallpaper companies in America.

Notes

External links
 Thomas Strahan Company

1847 births
Scottish emigrants to the United States
Businesspeople from Massachusetts
Politicians from Brookline, Massachusetts
Mayors of Chelsea, Massachusetts
Republican Party members of the Massachusetts House of Representatives
1910 deaths
19th-century American politicians
Massachusetts city council members
19th-century American businesspeople